Tevfik Kolaylı (March 24, 1879 – January 28, 1953), better known by his pen name Neyzen Tevfik, was a Turkish poet, satirist, and neyzen (a "ney performer" in Turkish). He was born in Bodrum and died in Istanbul. His name is occasionally misspelled as Neyzen Teyfik.

Biography
Tevfik learned Persian as a young man, and became a Mevlevi in İzmir. He then moved to Istanbul and continued his Mevlevi practice in Galata and Kasımpaşa. In 1902 he became a Bektashi dervish.

His interest in poetry influenced him into meeting with Mehmet Akif Ersoy. As was the case with many other intellectuals of his period, Tevfik's satirical poetry critical of the conservative sultan Abdul Hamid II resulted in his exile to Egypt in 1903, which he later visited again between 1908 and 1913.

Neyzen Tevfik's fame in popular Turkish culture is mainly due to his virtuosity with the ney. Moreover, he was also a heavy drinker while practicing a form of Islam as it was common among Bektashis. He therefore is also a symbol of a clash between the orthodox Islamic doctrine, and the Bektashi order that he was in, as illustrated in the following translation of his writing:

His religious views were highly mixed and tend to change in accordance with his mood. Yet, in his last years, he wrote a poem "Türk'e Birinci Öğüt" (First counsel to the Turk) in which a verse, regarding religious institutions mentioned before the verse, says:

"Varsa aslı bunların alemde siksinler beni."

(If any of these are true, well, fuck me.)

Therefore he can be considered a radical, if not directly atheist or non-theistic.

Yet, in a scholarly article that takes into account his overall life, including final utterings, shows that he was a genuine believer even though he criticized superficial religiosity: "Hayatında kendisine maddî imkânlar sağlayacak kişilere iltifat etmemiş, bildiği ve inandığı gibi yaşamıştır. “Felsefemde yok ötem, ben çünki sırr-ı vâhidim / Cem‘-i kesrette yekûnen sıfr-ı mutlak olmuşum / Yokluğumla âşikârım, Ehl-i beyt’e âidim / Secdemin şeklindeki ism-i Muhammed şâhidim” mısraları ve ölümüne çok yakın bir zamanda kendisini ziyarete gelen Cemalettin Server’e söylediği, “Şahit ol Server, ben şuurlu bir müminim” sözü onun dinî inancı hakkında bir kanaat verir."

Tevfik is featured in the sculptor Gürdal Duyars monument Şairler Sofası together with 6 other poets. Elsewhere in the same park, another sculpture of him by Namık Denizhan sits on a bench.

Poetry 
 Hiç, 1919 
 Dilara'ya Maktuplar ,1953

Music 
 Nihavent Saz Semaisi
 Şehnazbuselik Saz Semaisi 
 Taksimler, taş plak.

References

External links
 Biyografi.net - Biography of Neyzen Tevfik 
 mbdincaslan.com - His Selected Works 

Ney players
Turkish flautists
Turkish non-fiction writers
20th-century Turkish poets
Turkish satirists
20th-century writers from the Ottoman Empire
Mevlevi Order
1953 deaths
1879 births
People from Muğla
Composers of Ottoman classical music
Composers of Turkish makam music
Musicians of Ottoman classical music
Musicians of Turkish makam music